The Thomas and Dorothy Leavey Library is one of the two main undergraduate libraries at the University of Southern California, United States. It was named in memory of Thomas E. Leavey, the founder of Farmers Insurance Group.

History
The library, completed in the mid-1990s, reflected a shift to designs closer to earlier Romanesque Revival architecture. It was named in honor of Thomas E. Leavey, the founder of Farmers Insurance Group, and his wife, Dorothy Leavey. The donation was made through their Thomas and Dorothy Leavey Foundation in 1994.

References

External links 
 Overview of Leavey Library

Library buildings completed in 1994
Libraries in Los Angeles
University of Southern California buildings and structures
1994 establishments in California